The Model C stellarator was the first large-scale stellarator to be built, during the early stages of fusion power research. Planned since 1952, construction began in 1961 at what is today the Princeton Plasma Physics Laboratory (PPPL). The Model C followed the table-top sized Model A, and a series of Model B machines that refined the stellarator concept and provided the basis for the Model C, which intended to reach break-even conditions. Model C ultimately failed to reach this goal, producing electron temperatures of 400 eV when about 100,000 were needed. In 1969, after UK researchers confirmed that the USSR's T-3 tokamak was reaching 1000 eV, the Model C was converted to the Symmetrical Tokamak, and stellarator development at PPPL ended.

Design parameters
The Model C had a racetrack shape. The total length (of the tube axis?) was 1.2m. The plasma could have a 5-7.5 cm minor radius. Magnetic coils could produce a toroidal field (along the tube) of 35,000 Gauss. It was only capable of pulsed operation.

It had a divertor in one of the straight sections. In the other it could inject 4 MW of 25 MHz ion cyclotron resonance heating (ICRH).

It had helical windings on the curved sections.

Results
An average ion temperature of 400 eV was reached in 1969.

History
Construction funding/approval was announced in April 1957 with the design based on Katherine Weimer's efforts in fundamental research.

It started operating March 1962.

The Model C was reconfigured as a tokamak in 1969, becoming the Symmetric Tokamak (ST).

References

Further reading
Experiments on the Model C stellarator.  S. Yoshikawa and T.H. Stix  
A CONCEPTUAL DESIGN OF THE MODEL C STELLARATOR. 1956 Says 9" vacuum tube, but 150 ft long seems unlikely. 150,000 kW peak of pulsed power to the magnets.

Stellarators
Princeton Plasma Physics Laboratory